Chrispa (selftitled) is an album released by Greek singer Chrispa. It was released in Greece in 2004 by Minos EMI and it was repackaged as Chrispa 100% in 2005 to contain the single "Andres 100%", remixes and a bonus DVD.

Track listing

Original edition
 "Fevgo Gia To Epta"
 "An Den Ipirhes"
 "Mou Kanei Plaka O Theos"
 "I Kolasi Eimai Ego"
 "Pes Mou Sto Theo Sou"
 "Akatallila Oneira"
 "Savvatokiriako"
 "Afise Me"
 "Den Mou Eisai Aparetitos"
 "Den Ksereis Pote"
 "Afou Den M'Agapas"
 "Aparigoriti Kardia Mou"
 "Pali Tha Peis Signomi"

Chrispa 100%
CD
 "Andres 100%"
 "Fevgo Gia To Epta"
 "An Den Ipirhes"
 "Mou Kanei Plaka O Theos"
 "I Kolasi Eimai Ego"
 "Pes Mou Sto Theo Sou"
 "Akatallila Oneira"
 "Savvatokiriako"
 "Afise Me"
 "Den Mou Eisai Aparetitos"
 "Den Kseris Pote"
 "Afou Den M'Agapas"
 "Aparigoriti Kardia Mou"
 "Pali Tha Pis Signomi"
 "Mou Kanei Plaka O Theos (Gold Dance Remix)"
 "Savvatokiriako (Marios Psimopoulos Remix)"
 "Pali Tha Pis Signomi (Dance Remix)"

DVD
 "Mou Kanei Plaka O Theos"
 "Fevgo Gia To Epta
 "An Den Ipirhes (Oriflame Version)"
 "Documentary / Making Of"

References

2004 albums
2005 albums
Greek-language albums
Minos EMI albums
Chrispa albums